LGS may refer to:

Education

Schools
Lahore Grammar School
Lanark Grammar School
Langley Grammar School
Larne Grammar School
Leeds Grammar School
Leicester Grammar School
Limavady Grammar School
Loughborough Grammar School, one of the Loughborough Endowed Schools

Other
Liselere Geçiş Sınavı, the old name for OKS.
Local gaming store. A store to play or purchase board games.

Entertainment
Looking Glass Studios, a defunct computer game company
La Grande Sophie, a French singer-songwriter

Science
Laser guide star, an adaptive optics instrument used in Astronomy
Leaky gut syndrome, an intestinal dysfunction
LGS Innovations, a high-tech private company and former division of Bell Labs
Latitudinal Gradients in Species diversity
Lennox–Gastaut syndrome, a type of epilepsy
Light Gauge Steel, also called cold-formed steel

Software
Logitech Gaming Software, a driver style software for Logitech Gaming products